Wang Tau Hom is one of the 25 constituencies in the Wong Tai Sin District in Hong Kong. The constituency returns one district councillor to the Wong Tai Sin District Council, with an election every four years.

The constituency has an estimated population of 16,981.

Councillors represented

1982 to 1985

1985 to 1991

1994 to present

Election results

2010s

References

Wang Tau Hom
Constituencies of Hong Kong
Constituencies of Wong Tai Sin District Council
1982 establishments in Hong Kong
Constituencies established in 1982
1994 establishments in Hong Kong
Constituencies established in 1994